The Aberdeenshire Cup is a Scottish football tournament for all senior clubs affiliated to the Aberdeenshire and District Football Association (ADFA), being clubs from the historic counties of Aberdeenshire and Banffshire. The Aberdeenshire Cup is currently sponsored by the Evening Express newspaper.

Aberdeen F.C. are the most successful team in the competition, having won it a record thirty-five times. The current holders are Fraserburgh, after prevailing on penalties against Formartine United at The Haughs, Turriff, in the most recent competition.

Origin
The competition was first held in 1887 and was organised by the ADFA which formed the same year. The first members were Aberdeen, Orion, Caledonian, Aberdeen Athletic, Aberdeen Rovers, Aberdeen Rangers, Bon Accord, Black Diamond, Turriff Our Boys, Albert, Rosebery, Britannia, Granite City, Aberdeen City Wanderers and Balmoral.
Dr Maitland Moir, honorary president, presented the ADFA with a cup which ultimately became the property of Aberdeen after their second win in 1889. After this the ADFA bought a new trophy which was first presented after the final in 1890. The whereabouts of the original trophy is currently unknown.

Winners

List of Winners

References

 
Football cup competitions in Scotland
Football in Aberdeen
Football in Aberdeenshire
Football in Moray